Eli Gardner (born June 14, 1986) is an American football coach who is currently the head coach at Stonehill College, a role he has held since the 2016 season. He played college football at Western New England University.

Head coaching record

References

External links
 
 Stonehill profile

1986 births
Living people
American football linebackers
Western New England Golden Bears football players
Western New England Golden Bears football coaches
Stonehill Skyhawks football coaches